Roland Fischnaller (born 14 June 1975 in Villnöß) is an Italian former alpine skier who competed in the 2002 Winter Olympics.

Career 
Roland Fischnaller is the foremost successful Italian alpine snowboarder of all time, with various honors to his title. His enormous moment came in 2015 within the Austrian resort of Kreischberg, where he earned gold medal. He won the first place at the Parallel Slalom World Cup in 2013 and second place in the classification in 2012 and 2013.

At the age of 10, he started snowboarding in San Pietro Val di Funes in northern Italy after support from his sister. He went on to make his big appearance at the FIS World Glass in 1999. Now, after more than 20 years of successful experience, he is a specialist parallel slalom rider.

in 2010, Roland had his first World Cup victory in Limone, Italy. in 2012, he repeated his success and again won the World Cup.

References

External links
 

1975 births
Living people
Italian male alpine skiers
Olympic alpine skiers of Italy
Alpine skiers at the 2002 Winter Olympics
Germanophone Italian people
People from Villnöß
Alpine skiers of Centro Sportivo Carabinieri
Sportspeople from Südtirol